Mexborough Junction was one of two railway stations which served the former mining town of Mexborough in the Don Valley of South Yorkshire, England, prior to the present station being opened in 1871, the other being .

The station was opened to passengers in January 1850 and closed, with the opening of the present station on 4 March 1871.

This station was some distance from the town centre which, at the time, was around the parish church and close by Ferry Boat Halt.

References 

The South Yorkshire Railway by D. L. Franks. 1971. Turntable Enterprises. 

Disused railway stations in Doncaster
Former South Yorkshire Railway stations
Railway stations in Great Britain opened in 1850
Railway stations in Great Britain closed in 1871
Mexborough